Manchester Jewish Museum occupies the former Spanish and Portuguese synagogue and an adjacent building on Cheetham Hill Road in Manchester, England. It is a grade II* listed building.

The synagogue was completed in 1874 but the building became redundant through the migration of the Jewish population away from the Cheetham area further north to Prestwich and Whitefield. It re-opened as a museum in March 1984 telling the story of the history of Jewish settlement in Manchester and its community over the last 200 years.

The museum reopened on 2 July 2021 following a £6 million pound redevelopment and extension. The new museum includes a new gallery, vegetarian café, shop and learning studio and kitchen as well as complete restoration of the Spanish and Portuguese synagogue.

Following completion of the renovation works, Manchester Jewish Museum won two awards at the annual British Construction Industry Awards (Cultural and Leisure Project of the Year and Best Small Project of the Year) alongside architects Citizens Design Bureau and structural engineers Buro Happold.

The museum holds over 31,000 items in its collection, documenting the story of Jewish migration and settlement in Manchester. The collection is considered by historians to be of national and international significance and our synagogue has been described by Historic England as “one of the highlights of Victorian Gothic architecture in the country”. It includes Over 530 oral history testimonies, over 20,000 photographs, 138 recorded interviews with Holocaust Survivors and refugees and a wide-ranging collection of objects, documents and ephemera.

Moorish revival building

The synagogue was built in the Moorish Revival style by the noted Manchester architect Edward Salomons in 1874.  Although it is far from being the largest or most magnificent of the world's many Moorish revival synagogues, which include the opulent Princes Road Synagogue in Liverpool, it is considered by architectural historian H.A. Meeks to be a "jewel".  The style, a homage to the architecture of Moorish Spain, perhaps seemed particularly fitting for the home of a Sephardic congregation.  The two tiers of horseshoe windows on the facade are emblematic of the style, and the recessed doorway and arcade of five windows on the floor above the entrance are particularly decorative.  Inside, a horseshoe arch frames the heichal and polychrome columns support the galleries.  The mashrabiyya latticework on the front doors is particularly fine.

See also

Grade II* listed buildings in Greater Manchester
Listed buildings in Manchester-M8

References
Footnotes

Bibliography

External links
Official website
Spanish & Portuguese Synagogue on Jewish Communities and Records - UK (hosted by jewishgen.org).

Grade II* listed buildings in Manchester
Grade II* listed religious buildings and structures
Manchester
Jews and Judaism in Manchester
Moorish Revival synagogues
Museums in Manchester
Synagogues completed in 1874
Synagogues in Manchester
Synagogues preserved as museums
Judaism in England
Religious museums in England
Moorish Revival architecture in the United Kingdom
Sephardi synagogues
Sephardi Jewish culture in the United Kingdom
Spanish and Portuguese Jews